The Briarwood School is a private Kindergarten through 12th grade school located in far western Houston, Texas, United States.

Briarwood admits children with diagnosed learning difficulties and exhibited learning differences, which may include attention deficit disorder, hyperactivity, and pervasive developmental disorders.

Each year, about 300 students enroll at Briarwood. Of the students, Eighty percent have average to high intelligence and are placed in classes to meet their academic needs. The children are either in the Lower School (grades Kindergarten through 6) or the Middle/Upper School (grades 7 through 12).

Twenty percent of the students at Briarwood are developmentally delayed and enrolled in the Tuttle (Special) School.

Location
Briarwood is next to Ashford Elementary School, a public kindergarten through 2nd grade school operated by the Houston Independent School District.

Former students
 Woody Harrelson, Actor

Arts 
The Briarwood School boasts a successful theatre and arts program. One professionally directed theatre production is performed each semester. Some students who graduate from Briarwood go on to colleges and universities associated with the arts, such as Santa Fe University of Art and Design, CalArts, Pratt Institute and Savannah College of Art and Design.

Athletics 
The Briarwood Mustangs have a large array of sports for Middle/Upper School as well as for Tuttle School, in which all students are welcome to be a team member. Sports include flag football (Boys only), soccer, basketball, tennis, golf (grades 9-12 only), Track & Field, Bowling (Tuttle School only), Volleyball, and Cross Country (9-12). The Briarwood School is associated with TAPPS as well as the Texas Christian Athletic League.

See also

Houston Area Independent Schools

References

Private K-12 schools in Houston
Educational institutions established in 1966
1966 establishments in Texas